Ferid Chouchane (born 19 April 1973 in Sousse) is a retired Tunisian football defender. He played for Étoile du Sahel and Club Africain in Tunisia and had spells at Qatar and Saudi Arabia.

International career
Chouchane made his debut for the national team in 1994 in a friendly match against Algeria, scoring the only goal of the match. He was a member of the Tunisian national team at the 1998 FIFA World Cup, starting 2 matches as a center back. His last international match was in 2001 against Gabon in the 2002 African Cup of Nations qualification.

Managerial career
In 2010, Chouchane was appointed as assistant manager of Moroccan team Wydad Casablanca. One year later, he moved back to Tunisia to be assistant manager of Étoile du Sahel, becoming sporting director in 2012.

References

External links

1973 births
Living people
Tunisian footballers
1998 FIFA World Cup players
Footballers at the 1996 Summer Olympics
Olympic footballers of Tunisia
Tunisia international footballers
Tunisian Ligue Professionnelle 1 players
Qatar Stars League players
Saudi Professional League players
Étoile Sportive du Sahel players
Club Africain players
Al-Rayyan SC players
Al-Qadsiah FC players
1996 African Cup of Nations players
1998 African Cup of Nations players
Association football defenders
Expatriate footballers in Qatar
Tunisian expatriate sportspeople in Qatar
Expatriate footballers in Saudi Arabia
Tunisian expatriate sportspeople in Saudi Arabia